Vo or VO may refer to:

Businesses and brands
 Austrian Arrows (2003-2015, IATA airline code VO)
 VLM Airlines Slovenia (2016-2018, IATA airline code VO)
 Seagram's VO Whiskey

Language
 Volapük language (ISO 639-1 code vo)
 VO language, a language in which the verb typically comes before the object
Vo (letter)

Places
 Vo', a commune in the Province of Padua, Italy
 Vo, Togo, a prefecture in Togo
 Vojvodina, an autonomous province in Serbia (ISO 3166-2 code RS-VO)

Science and technology
 Value Object or similarly data transfer object, in computing
 Vanadium(II) oxide, an inorganic compound
 Velocity obstacle, the set of velocities of a robot that will result in a collision with another robot
 Virtual Observatory, in astronomy
 Visual Objects, an object-oriented computer programming language
 Vote ordering, a concurrency control technique for guaranteeing global serializability; a generalization of commitment ordering

Other uses
 Võ, a Vietnamese surname
 Vendetta Online, a computer game
 Virtual organization, an organization involving detached and disseminated entities
 Voice-over, a production technique in film, radio, and other media